The Sins Ye Do is a 1924 British silent romance film directed by Fred LeRoy Granville and starring Joan Lockton, Henry Victor and Eileen Dennes. It was made at Cricklewood Studios by Stoll Pictures.

Plot summary 
Pictures and the Picturegoer described the film as "a British love drama about a man whose life is almost wrecked by the indiscretions of a friend".

Cast
 Joan Lockton as Lady Athol / Nadine  
 Henry Victor as Ronald Hillier  
 Eileen Dennes as Lady Eslin  
 May Hanbury as Muriel Allendale  
 Jameson Thomas as Captain Barrington  
 Jerrold Robertshaw as Sir Philip Athol  
 Eric Bransby Williams as Neville Fane  
 Leslie Attwood as Nadine  
 Edward O'Neill as Bishop Hillier  
 Frank Perfitt as Dr. Rutherford  
 Annie Esmond as Governess

References

External links
 

1924 films
1920s romance films
British romance films
British silent feature films
Films directed by Fred LeRoy Granville
Films shot at Cricklewood Studios
Stoll Pictures films
British black-and-white films
1920s English-language films
1920s British films